Paula Sémer (9 April 1925 – 1 June 2021) was a Belgian actress and politician. A member of Socialistische Partij, she served in the Senate of Belgium from 1995 to 1999.

Distinctions
Commander of the Order of the Crown
Officer of the Order of Leopold

References

1925 births
2021 deaths
Belgian actresses
20th-century Belgian politicians
20th-century Belgian women politicians
Members of the Senate (Belgium)
Women members of the Senate (Belgium)
Actors from Antwerp
Politicians from Antwerp
Socialistische Partij Anders politicians
Recipients of the Order of the Crown (Belgium)
Order of Leopold (Belgium)
Deaths by euthanasia